The Liberal Alliance for Democracy (ALIDE) is a political party in Burundi. It was founded in 2002. ALIDE advocates for free-market capitalism and liberal democracy. They currently hold no seats in Burundi's national parliament.

References 

Political parties in Burundi